This is a list of electoral results for the electoral district of Wangaratta and Ovens in Victorian state elections.

Members for Wangaratta and Ovens

Election results

Elections in the 1940s

Elections in the 1930s

Elections in the 1920s

References

Victoria (Australia) state electoral results by district